Ozherelye is a microdistrict of the town of Kashira, formerly a town in Kashirsky District of Moscow Oblast, Russia, located  south of Moscow and  southeast of Kashira, the administrative center of the district. Population:

History
It was first mentioned in 1578 as a village and was granted town status in 1958.

Administrative and municipal status
Within the framework of administrative divisions, it is, together with three rural localities, incorporated within Kashirsky District as the Town of Ozherelye. As a municipal division, the Town of Ozherelye is incorporated within Kashirsky Municipal District as Ozherelye Urban Settlement.

Transportation

The town is an important railway junction.

References

Notes

Sources

Cities and towns in Moscow Oblast